Desemzia is a bacterial genus from the family of Carnobacteriaceae, with one known species (Desemzia incerta).

References

Further reading 
 

Lactobacillales
Monotypic bacteria genera
Bacteria genera